Hay Urban District was established under the provisions of the Local Government Act 1894, and existed until 1974, when its role was taken over by Brecknock.

Details, including information on the archives can be founded here 

Urban districts of Wales
Hay-on-Wye